Bridges to Babylon is the 21st British and 23rd American studio album by the English rock band the Rolling Stones, released by Virgin Records on 29 September 1997. Released as a double album on vinyl and as a single CD, it was supported by the year-long worldwide Bridges to Babylon Tour that was met with much success.

Unlike the prior several albums, which the production and songwriting team of vocalist Mick Jagger and guitarist Keith Richards had co-produced alongside a single outside producer, the Stones brought in an eclectic mix of superstar producers, including the Dust Brothers, Don Was, and Rob Fraboni among others. Similarly, a wide array of guest musicians appeared on each of the tracks alongside band members Jagger, Richards, Ronnie Wood on guitar and Charlie Watts on drums. The sprawling album features a wide range of genres, including the Stones-standard blues rock, sample-laden hip hop and rap. The band was once again not on speaking terms during the recording of the album, with Jagger and Richards each recording their parts separately and rarely appearing in the studio together. However, they had repaired their relationship well enough to embark on a wildly successful tour to support the album.

Though critics gave the album mixed reviews, it sold well, reaching platinum or gold status in many markets, and produced the worldwide Top 40 single "Anybody Seen My Baby?".

Background and recording
Following the Voodoo Lounge Tour from 1994 to 1995, and the album Stripped, the Stones afforded themselves a brief respite before Mick Jagger and Keith Richards began composing new songs together in the summer of 1996, with demos to follow as they met in New York in November and London the following month. Another writing session took place in Barbados in January 1997.

In March 1997, the band arrived in Los Angeles to start the recording sessions at Ocean Way Studios. After many albums recorded in isolated islands, working in a big city allowed for the contribution of various musician friends of the band. Bridges to Babylon was recorded until July, and the four-month production made it one of their most concise periods of recording in years. The sessions were frequently all-nighters that lasted until Richards got tired by the morning.

Although Don Was produced again, Jagger arrived before the other members of the Stones to seek local producers. First were The Dust Brothers, who had impressed Jagger with their work on Beck's Odelay and the Beastie Boys' Paul's Boutique. The Dust Brothers' contributions were initially five, but were reduced to three, which marked the only Stones songs to feature sampling. Danny Saber and Babyface were also brought in by Jagger, though the latter's contributions to the track "Already Over Me" were eventually discarded. Richards was not keen on the idea of working with 'loop gurus', going as far as expelling Saber from the studio once he found him overdubbing guitars. Richards brought in Rob Fraboni for his solo material, and Was made sure to work with Richards and Jagger in separate rooms. Drummer Charlie Watts would relieve the tense environment by working with percussionist Jim Keltner, whom he later drafted for a solo project. By the final week of recording, the Stones were not on speaking terms, with Jagger boycotting sessions arranged by Richards' crew and Watts leaving Los Angeles as soon as he finished his contributions.

During the album's mastering, the chorus of the projected lead single, "Anybody Seen My Baby?", was found to resemble the 1992 hit "Constant Craving" by k.d. lang, a discovery brought to Richards' attention by his daughter Angela. Seeking to avoid possible future legal entanglements, Lang and her co-writer Ben Mink were credited along with Jagger and Richards on the new tune. It reached No. 22 in the UK and also became a U.S. radio rock hit.

A total of eight different musicians played bass on the sessions for the album: Jeff Sarli, Jamie Muhoberac, Pierre de Beauport, Don Was, Danny Saber, Darryl Jones, Me'shell Ndegeocello, and Doug Wimbish.

Packaging
Once the Rolling Stones had picked Stefan Sagmeister to be the album's art director, Jagger told him to seek inspiration from Babylonian art exhibited at the British Museum. Sagmeister was most impressed by a Lamassu sculpture, featuring a lion with a human head and beard, and commissioned artist Kevin Murphy to paint a similar Assyrian lion in an attack stance. The first million units of Bridges to Babylon were encased in a special manufactured filigree slipcase, that gave the impression that the lion was embedded into the design. The desert background of the cover was extended throughout the booklet, featuring ruins that were the basis for the stage design of the Bridges to Babylon Tour.

Release and reception 

Bridges to Babylon, containing an unprecedented three solo vocals by Richards, was released to mixed reviews. It reached No. 6 in the UK, No. 2 in France and No. 3 in the US, where it was certified platinum by the RIAA in November 1997. As of January 2010, Bridges to Babylon had sold 1.1 million copies in the U.S. Further singles "Saint of Me" and concert staple "Out of Control" were also minor hits.

By this point, the Stones had become a touring phenomenon. The Bridges to Babylon Tour in 1997 consisted of 108 concerts, with an elaborate stage design Jagger aimed to make similar to U2's PopMart Tour. Four of the album's thirteen songs made the tour's set list: "Flip the Switch", "Anybody Seen My Baby?", "Saint of Me" and "Out of Control".

In 2009, Bridges to Babylon was remastered and reissued by Universal Music.

Track listing

Personnel
The Rolling Stones
Mick Jagger – lead vocals, guitar, harmonica, keyboards, guitar [wah-wah guitar], shaker (track 7), acoustic guitar (track 8)
Keith Richards – guitar, backing vocals; lead vocals on "You Don't Have to Mean It", "Thief in the Night" and "How Can I Stop", acoustic guitar, piano (track 12)
Ronnie Wood – guitar, backing vocals, slide guitar (track 9), pedal steel, (tracks 10, 11) dobro
Charlie Watts – drums, percussion

Production

 The Glimmer Twins – production (all tracks)
 Don Was – production (all but "Saint of Me", "Might As Well Get Juiced" and "Gunface")
 The Dust Brothers – production ("Anybody Seen My Baby?", "Saint of Me" and "Might As Well Get Juiced")
 Rob Fraboni – production, mixing ("You Don't Have to Mean It"), engineering
 Danny Saber – production ("Gunface")
 Pierre de Beauport – production ("Always Suffering")
 Tom Lord-Alge – mixing 
 John X Volaitis – mixing ("Gunface")
 Wally Gagel – mixing ("Out of Control")
 Bob Clearmountain – mixing ("Already Over Me")
 Stefan Sagmeister – art direction and design
 Hjalti Karlsson – design
 Max Vadukul – photography
 Kevin Murphy – illustration
Gerard Howland (Floating Company) – illustration
Alan Ayers – illustration

Additional musicians

Darryl Jones – bass
Me'Shell Ndegeocello – bass (track 8) 
Danny Saber – bass, guitar, keyboards (track 5), bass, Clavinet, "reality manipulations" effects (track 7) 
Jeff Sarli –  bass guitar (track 1), acoustic bass (tracks 11, 13)
Don Was – bass (track 4), piano, keyboards (track 4, 7), Wurlitzer piano (track 7, 13)
Blondie Chaplin – bass, backing vocals, maracas (track 3), piano (track 4, 11, 13), tambourine (track 11)
Pierre de Beauport – six–string bass (track 8), Wurlitzer piano, Fender Rhodes piano (track 12)
Jamie Muhoberac – bass (track 2), keyboards (track 2, 7)
Doug Wimbish – backing vocals, bass (track 9)
Waddy Wachtel – electric guitar (track 3), guitar (tracks 7-9, 11-13), acoustic guitar (track 10)
Matt Clifford – piano, Hammond B-3 organ (track 6)
Billy Preston – organ (track 8)
Benmont Tench – Hammond C-3 organ, keyboards (track 4) piano (track 10)
Darrell Leonard – trumpet (track 12)
Wayne Shorter – soprano saxophone (track 13)
Joe Sublett – saxophone (track 12)
Biz Markie – rapping
Bernard Fowler – backing vocals
Jim Keltner – percussion
Kenny Aronoff – bucket

Charts

Weekly charts

Year-end charts

Certifications and sales

References

External links
 
 Overview of the packaging from Stefan Sagmeister

1997 albums
Albums produced by Don Was
Albums produced by the Glimmer Twins
Albums produced by the Dust Brothers
Albums produced by Rob Fraboni
Albums with cover art by Stefan Sagmeister
The Rolling Stones albums
Virgin Records albums
Albums recorded at United Western Recorders